This page lists the known episodes of Nexo Knights.

Series overview

Episodes

Season 1 (2015–16)

Season 2 (2016)

Season 3 (2017)

Season 4 (2017)

References

Lists of animated television series episodes
Lego television series